Amr ibn Khalid al-Bariqi al-Azdi(died 680) was one of the Companions of Husayn ibn Ali, who was martyred along with him in the battle of Karbala. Amr ibn Khalid joined Husayn ibn Ali in Karbala and fought alongside him.  He belonged to bariq of Banu Azd tribe. His son Khalid was amongst Martyrs of Karbala.

Lineage 

His full name was Amr b. Khalid b. al-Harith b. Awf b. Amr b. Sa`d b. Thailbh b. Kinanah al-Bariqi  Ibn Bariq Ibn Uday Ibn Haritha Ibn Amr Mazikiee Ibn Aamr bin Haritha Algtarif bin Imru al-Qais Thailb bin Mazen Ibn Al-Azd Ibn Al-Ghoth Ibn Nabit Ibn Malik bin Zaid Ibn Kahlan Ibn Saba'a (Sheba) Ibn Yashjub Ibn Yarab Ibn Qahtan Ibn Hud (Eber).

Asmaa b. Khalid al-Bariqi was  his Brother.

See also 

 Husayn ibn Ali
 Battle of Karbala
 Martyrs of Karbala
 Mourning of Muharram
 Day of Ashura

References 

Year of birth unknown
680 deaths
7th-century Muslims
Converts to Islam
Iraqi Shia Muslims
Banu Bariq
People killed at the Battle of Karbala